2D Plus Delta (also 2D+Delta) is a method of encoding 3D image listed as a part of MPEG2 and MPEG4 standards, specifically on the H.264 implementation of the Multiview Video Coding extension. This technology originally started as a proprietary method for Stereoscopic Video Coding and content deployment that utilizes the Left or Right channel as the 2D version and the optimized difference or disparity (Delta) between that image channel view and a second eye image view is injected into the video stream as user_data, secondary stream, independent stream, enhancement layer or NALu for deployment. The Delta data can be either a spatial stereo disparity, temporal predictive, bidirectional, or optimized motion compensation.

Overview
The technology was originally filed for protection World Wide via WIPO in 2003, submitted the patent statements to ISO in 2007 and listed as part of the MVC standard in 2008 and is now considered an Open Standard available for licensing and usage under a worldwide, non-discriminatory basis and on reasonable terms and conditions.

The MVC initiative was started in June 2006.

The resulting video stream has the following characteristics:
 Contains the full information to reconstruct the Left and Right stereoscopic views in full resolution per eye
 Requires an additional average bandwidth ranging from 30% to 60% regarding a 2D only stream depending on the encoding implementation
 Can be deployed over existing pipelines, starting from 16Mbit/s for 1080p@60fps per eye
 One single video stream services both: 3D viewers and 2D Legacy users
 Can be seamlessly decoded by 2D legacy decoders in full 2D HD without the need for any change or additional hardware

2D Plus Delta has been listed at ISO/ITU/IEC/MPEG2/MPEG4/MVC initiatives.

 MPEG4 ISO/IEC 14496-10:2009
 MPEG4 ISO/IEC 14496-10:2008 - 07
 MPEG4 ISO/IEC 14496-10:2008/FDAmd 1 - 01
 MPEG4 ISO/IEC 14496-10:2008/FDAmd 1 - 02
 MPEG4 ISO/IEC 14496-15:2004/CD Amd 3 - 01
 MPEG4 ISO/IEC 14496-15:2004/CD Amd 3 - 02
 MPEG4 ISO/IEC 14496-4:2004/CD Amd 38 - 01
 MPEG4 ISO/IEC 14496-4:2004/CD Amd 38 - 02
 MPEG4 ISO/IEC 14496-5:2001/CD Amd 15 - 01
 MPEG4 ISO/IEC 14496-5:2001/CD Amd 15 - 02
 MPEG2 ISO/IEC 13818-1:2007/CD Amd 4 - 01
 MPEG2 ISO/IEC 13818-1:2007/CD Amd 4 - 02
 MPEG4 ISO/IEC 14496-10:2008 - 06
 MPEG4 ISO/IEC 14496-10:2008 - 07

There are two ways for stereoscopic 3D deployment of content to the home (3D television):
 Frame compatible: Pixel subsampling like Side by Side, Checkerboard, Quincunx and Color shifting like Anaglyph
 Enhanced Video stream Coding: 2D+Delta/MVC and 2D plus depth

See also 
 2D plus depth
 Multiview Video Coding
 Stereoscopic
 Anaglyph
 TDVision
 3DTV

References 

Stereoscopy
Graphics file formats